Melewar Industrial Group Berhad is a manufacturing company in Malaysia. It is owned by the family of its late founder and chairman Tunku Tan Sri Abdullah ibni Almarhum Tuanku Abdul Rahman from the Negeri Sembilan royal family and engages in the manufacturing and trade of steel products in addition to investments. It has 461 employees and is listed on the Kuala Lumpur Stock Exchange. Presently Melewar Industrial Group Berhad has an installed capacity of more than 22,000 m/tons per month with the ability to manufacture pipes from 10 mm to 355 mm O.D. MIG's products are widely used in the construction, furniture, automotive, bicycle, and engineering industries.

Business activities
MIG has three core business divisions;
 Iron and steel
 Energy
 Engineering

List of companies
Melewar Industrial Group Berhad group structure is shown below.

 Iron and steel
 Mycron Steel Berhad -Investment Holding Main Market Listed
 Mycron Steel CRC Sdn Bhd – Manufacturer of Cold Rolled Coil (“CRC”) Steel Sheets
Silver Victory Sdn Bhd - Trading of Steel Related Products
Melewar Steel Tube Sdn Bhd – Manufacturer of Steel Tubes
 Melewar Steel Mills Sdn Bhd – Manufacturer/Trader of Steel Rebar, Billets and Scrap
 Melewar Imperial Limited -Investment Holding
Jack Nathan Limited - Trading of Building Tools and Materials
Melewar Steel UK Ltd - Distribution of Steel Tube in the United Kingdom
 Ausgard Quick Assembly Systems Sdn Bhd - Steel Based Quick Assembly Homes Manufacturing
 Melbina Builders Ltd - Steel Based Quick Assembly Homes Marketing

 Others
 Melewar Ecology Sdn Bhd - Dormant
 Melewar Steel Services Sdn Bhd -Property Investment
 Melewar Steel Assets Sdn Bhd - Investment Holding
 Melewar Steel Engineering Sdn Bhd - Investment Holding - Power
 Mperial Power Ltd - Investment Holding - Power
 Siam Power Phase 2 Company Limited - Power Generation

Engineering
 Melewar Integrated Engineering Sdn Bhd - Engineering
 Melewar MycroSmelt Technology Ltd - Smelting / Billet Making Technology Owner

References

1972 establishments in Malaysia
Manufacturing companies based in Kuala Lumpur
Companies listed on Bursa Malaysia